Thulina Dilshan (born 17 March 1997) is a Sri Lankan cricketer. He made his first-class debut for Sri Lanka Army Sports Club in the 2018–19 Premier League Tournament on 28 December 2018. He made his List A debut for Sri Lanka Army Sports Club in the 2018–19 Premier Limited Overs Tournament on 8 March 2019. He made his Twenty20 debut on 8 January 2020, for Sri Lanka Army Sports Club in the 2019–20 SLC Twenty20 Tournament.

References

External links
 

1997 births
Living people
Sri Lankan cricketers
Sri Lanka Army Sports Club cricketers
Place of birth missing (living people)